Heteronympha is a genus of butterflies in the family Nymphalidae. The genus contains seven species.

Species
Listed alphabetically:
Heteronympha banksii Leach, 1814
Heteronympha cordace Geyer, 1832
Heteronympha merope Fabricius, 1775
Heteronympha mirifica Butler, 1866
Heteronympha paradelpha Lower, 1893
Heteronympha penelope Waterhouse, 1937
Heteronympha solandri Waterhouse, 1904

References

External links

Tree of Life Web Project

Satyrini
Butterfly genera
Taxa named by Hans Daniel Johan Wallengren